"Move It On Over" is a song written and recorded by the American country music singer-songwriter Hank Williams in 1947.

Background
"Move It On Over" was recorded on April 21, 1947 at Castle Studio in Nashville, Hank's first session for MGM and the same session that produced "I Saw the Light," "(Last Night) I Heard You Crying in Your Sleep," and "Six More Miles to the Graveyard."  Nashville had no session men during this period, so producer Fred Rose hired Red Foley's backing band, one of the sharpest around, to back Williams.  As biographer Colin Escott observes, Rose probably felt the instrumental break needed a touch of class to smooth out Williams' hillbilly edges, and the band, especially guitarist Zeke Turner, was likely too fancy for the singer's taste.

The song is considered one of the earliest examples of rock and roll music. Though many claim the song "Rock Around the Clock," released in 1954 by Bill Haley & His Comets, was the first rock and roll single, it resembles "Move it On Over", as both feature the same twelve-bar blues arrangement with a melody starting with three repetitions of an ascending arpeggio of the tonic chord. Williams' song was very similar to Charley Patton's "Going to Move to Alabama", recorded in 1929 – which itself was at least partly derived from Jim Jackson's "Kansas City Blues" from 1927.  The song also uses phrases from Count Basie's "Red Wagon", first recorded in 1939.

The song follows a man who is forced to sleep in the doghouse after coming home late at night and not being allowed into his house by his wife. In many respects, the song typified Williams' uncanny ability to express in a humorous way the aspects of everyday life that listeners could relate to - and rarely heard on the radio.  As fiddler Jerry Rivers later recalled, Hank's novelty songs "weren't novelty - they were serious, not silly, and that's why they were much better accepted and better selling.  'Move It on Over' hits right home, 'cause half of the people he was singing to were in the doghouse with the ol' lady."

“Move It on Over“ was Williams' first major hit, reaching #4 on the Billboard  Most Played Juke Box Folk Records chart and got him a write up in The Alabama Journal.  The revenue generated by the song was the first serious money the singer had ever seen in his life.  It also earned him a spot on the coveted Louisiana Hayride, the training ground for the Grand Ole Opry.

Chart performance

Hank Williams version

Cover versions
Many others have recorded and performed the song subsequently. Notable hit versions were performed by:
 Cowboy Copas and Grandpa Jones 1947
 by Jimmie and Leon Short (Decca 46077)
 Bill Haley & His Comets recorded July 15, 1957, released on album "Rockin' the Joint!" 1957
George Thorogood and the Delaware Destroyers scored a major FM hit with the song when it was released on their second album Move It on Over. 
A version by Travis Tritt with George Thorogood was included on the 1999 King of the Hill: Original Soundtrack album. It peaked at #66 on the Billboard Hot Country Singles & Tracks chart.

References

Sources
 

1947 singles
1999 singles
Songs written by Hank Williams
Bill Haley songs
Hank Williams songs
Travis Tritt songs
George Thorogood songs
1947 songs
MGM Records singles